Gymnopilus aureobrunneus is a species of mushroom in the family Hymenogastraceae.

Description

Habitat and distribution
Gymnopilus aureobrunneus grows on logs and stumps in Cuba.

See also

 List of Gymnopilus species

References

External links
Index Fungorum

aureobrunneus
Fungi of North America